Steve Pope (born 8 September 1976) is an English former footballer who played in the Football League for Crewe Alexandra and for a number of non-league sides. He had short spell as manager of Colwyn Bay from May 2008 to September 2008.

References

English footballers
English Football League players
1976 births
Living people
Crewe Alexandra F.C. players
Kidderminster Harriers F.C. players
Bromsgrove Rovers F.C. players
Halesowen Town F.C. players
AFC Telford United players
Kidsgrove Athletic F.C. players
Colwyn Bay F.C. players
Colwyn Bay F.C. managers
Association football defenders
English football managers